Nestronia is a monotypic genus of flowering plants in the family Santalaceae containing the single species Nestronia umbellula, which is known by the common names leechbrush, nestronia, conjurer's-nut, and Indian olive. It is native to the piedmont of the southeastern United States, usually occurring in isolated clonal colonies of all male or all female plants.

A rare small rhizomatous shrub, Nestronia is a hemiparasite on the roots of oaks and other hardwoods, as well as pines. Generally less than 1 meter tall, Nestronia has opposite leaves and branches and inconspicuous yellow-green flowers with 4 or 5 petal-like sepals.  The rare fruit is a yellow drupe containing one seed.

Nestronia, or physic-nut, is described growing in Georgia in Bartram's Travels.   Bartram states that when “the Indians go in pursuit of deer, they carry this fruit with them, supposedly with the power of charming the animal to them”.  Fruiting was perhaps more common in this species in Bartram's day than today.  Then male and female plants were more commonly found together, probably due to modern land usage.

References

External links
Carolina Nature
NameThatPlant.net

Santalaceae
Monotypic Santalales genera